Kalah Gun (also Romanized as Kalāh Gūn; also known as Kalā Gūn and Kaleh Gān) the village in Kuh Mareh Khami Rural District, in the Central District of Basht County, Kohgiluyeh and Boyer-Ahmad Province, Iran. At the 2006 census, its population was 158, in 29 families.

References 

Populated places in Basht County